Lars Näsman (14 July 1943 – 10 October 1995) is considered one of the best Finnish football goalkeepers of all time, having been capped for 37 full international matches.

He was voted the Player of the year in Finland in 1965 and 1967. He was also ranked 10th in the annual List of top sportsmen in Finland in 1967.

Career

Näsman was born in the coastal town of Vaasa in 1943. He started his playing career with VIFK from where he moved to Upon Pallo, Lahti. He joined the Dutch team Cambuur in 1969, remaining there for three years.

In 1971, he joined HIFK, who were runners up in the Finnish league in the same year.

He ended his playing career after 1976 season at Ekenäs IF.

Lars Näsman was not tall for a goalkeeper, only 178 cm. However, his fast reactions, good eye for the ball and speed made him the perfect choice for the Finland national team.

Bandy
Näsman was also the national goalkeeper for Finland in the sport of bandy, in which he was elected the Best goalkeeper in the world in 1967.

Coach
After his playing career, Näsman coached EIF a second division team in southern Finland.

Lars Näsman had strong opinions about how football should be developed in Finland and in 1970 he told YLE Television, "We must get rid of secret payments to players. Players must be paid openly for their work. Finland can never rise to international level if we don't give up semi-professionalism where players go to work and train in their spare time".

References

External links
  UEFA Wales–Finland 1971
UEFA Wales–Czechoslovakia 1971
UEFA  Finland–Romania 1966

Scotland–Finland 1965 Team 
Finland Football Association

1943 births
1995 deaths
Finnish footballers
Finland international footballers
Sportspeople from Vaasa
Finnish football managers
Finnish bandy players
Swedish-speaking Finns
Mestaruussarja players
HIFK Fotboll players
Association football goalkeepers